is a Japanese actor, film director, and singer. He was born August 12, 1958 in Okawa, Fukuoka. He made his directorial debut with Rockers (ロッカーズ or Rokkazu), a 2003 film based on his years as vocalist for the punk rock band The Rockers (ザ・ロッカーズ). He was nominated best actor for a Japanese Academy Award three times, once in 1988 and twice in 1989. He won the award for Best Actor at the 12th Hochi Film Awards for Chōchin.

Filmography

Films

Dramas

TV movies

As director and writer

References

External links

1958 births
Living people
Japanese male actors
Japanese racehorse owners and breeders
People from Ōkawa, Fukuoka
Actors from Fukuoka Prefecture
Musicians from Fukuoka Prefecture